Skydive Dubai–Al Ahli Pro Cycling Team is a men's professional UCI Continental cycling team, based in Dubai, United Arab Emirates. The team competes in the UCI Continental Circuits.

Team roster

Major wins

2014
 National Time Trial Championships, Soufiane Haddi
 National Road Race Championships, Adil Jelloul
 National Road Race Championships, Rafaâ Chtioui
Stage 1 Tour of Thailand, Lucas Sebastián Haedo
Melaka Governor's Cup, Alexandre Pliușchin
 Overall Tour de Kumano, Francisco Mancebo
Stage 2 Francisco Mancebo
Stage 1 Tour of Thailand, Lucas Sebastián Haedo
Stage 5 Tour de Singkarak, Óscar Pujol
Stage 8 Tour de Singkarak, Soufiane Haddi
 Overall Sharjah International Cycling Tour, Alexandre Pliușchin
Stages 1 & 3, Alexandre Pliușchin
Stage 2, Soufiane Haddi
 Overall Jelajah Malaysia, Rafaâ Chtioui
Stage 1, Rafaâ Chtioui
2015
 Overall Tour d'Egypte, Francisco Mancebo
Stage 1, Francisco Mancebo
Stages 2 & 4, Andrea Palini
Stage 3, Soufiane Haddi
 Overall La Tropicale Amissa Bongo, Rafaâ Chtioui
Stages 1 & 2, Rafaâ Chtioui
Stage 4, Andrea Palini
Stage 3 Tour du Maroc, Edgar Pinto
Stage 6 Tour du Maroc, Soufiane Haddi
Stage 8 Tour du Maroc, Vladimir Gusev
Stage 2 Tour of Japan, Rafaâ Chtioui
 National Time Trial Championships, Soufiane Haddi
 National Time Trial Championships, Rafaâ Chtioui
 National Road Race Championships, Rafaâ Chtioui
Stages 1 & 2 Tour of Hainan, Andrea Palini
Overall Sharjah International Cycling Tour, Soufiane Haddi
Stages 1, 2 & 3, Soufiane Haddi
Stage 4, Andrea Palini
UAE Cup, Maher Hasnaoui
Overall Jelajah Malaysia, Francisco Mancebo
Stage 1, Francisco Mancebo
Stage 2, Team time trial
Stage 4, Andrea Palini
Overall Tour of Al Zubarah, Maher Hasnaoui
Stage 1, Maher Hasnaoui
2016
Stages 1 & 2 La Tropicale Amissa Bongo, Andrea Palini
Stage 4 La Tropicale Amissa Bongo, Adil Jelloul
Stage 2 Tour de Langkawi, Andrea Palini
 National Time Trial Championships, Maher Hasnaoui
 National Time Trial Championships, Soufiane Haddi
Stage 1 Sharjah International Cycling Tour, Team time trial

National champions
2014
 Morocco Time Trial, Soufiane Haddi
 Morocco Road Race, Adil Jelloul
 Tunisia Road Race, Rafaâ Chtioui
2015
 Morocco Time Trial, Soufiane Haddi
 Tunisia Time Trial, Rafaâ Chtioui
 Tunisia Road Race, Rafaâ Chtioui
2016
 Tunisia Time Trial, Meher Hasnaoui

References

Cycling teams based in the United Arab Emirates
UCI Continental Teams (Asia)
Cycling teams established in 2014
2014 establishments in the United Arab Emirates